is a city located in Aomori Prefecture, Japan. , the city had an estimated population of 53,804 in 28553, and a population density of 62 persons per km2.

Geography
Mutsu occupies most of Shimokita Peninsula and is bordered by Mutsu Bay to the south and Tsugaru Strait to the north, and is the northernmost city on the island of Honshū. The volcanic Osorezan Mountain Range extends across the western and central portion of the city, and includes a number of caldera lakes. Mount Hiuchidake, 781 meters above sea level, is on the north side, and Mount Osore is on the south side. At the center of Mount Osore is a caldera with a diameter of about 3 kilometers, inside which is a caldera lake called Lake Usori. Mount Kamabu (elevation 879m) is located southeast of the caldera's outer rim, and is the highest point of Mount Osore. The Tanabe River, which originates from the Shimokita Hills, flows through Tanabu, the center of Mutsu City, and the Tanabe Plain spreads out in the basin. The population is concentrated in the Tanabe, Ōhira, and Ōminato neighborhoods. Ōminato is located at the foot of Mount Kamabu, facing Ōminato Bay where the waves are calm. There is a sand spit called Ashizaki in Ōminato Bay, and the inside of the sand spit is called Ashizaki Bay, which is a natural harbor. The Shimokita hills stretch in the southeastern part of the city.

Parts of the city is within the limits of the Shimokita Hantō Quasi-National Park, including Mount Osore, Yagen Valley, and Taijima.

Neighboring municipalities
Aomori Prefecture
Kazamaura
Ōma
Higashidōri
Sai
Yokohama

Climate
Mutsu has a rare oceanic climate (Köppen: Cfb) or warm-summer humid continental climate (Dfb) by 0 °C isoterm, the south of the city being the northern boundary of the hot-summer type (Dfa) in Aomori, disregarding rural areas in the west. The city is characterized by warm summers and cool to cold winters with heavy snowfall.  The average annual temperature in Mutsu is 9.8 °C. The average annual rainfall is 1339 mm with September as the wettest month. The temperatures are highest on average in August, at around 20.3 °C, and lowest in January, at around -4.6 °C.

Demographics
Per Japanese census data, the population of Mutsu has declined over the past 40 years.

History
Mutsu was founded as September 1, 1959 through the merger of the former towns of Ōminato and Tanabu.  Tanabu had been the location of a daikansho under the Morioka Domain in the Edo period, and was a resettlement and colonization zone for dispossessed ex-samurai of the defeated Aizu Domain after the Boshin War. The village of Ōminato was established with the creation of the modern municipalities system on 1 April 1889, and was raised to town status on November 10, 1928. Ōminato was a port town, and home to the Ōminato Guard District, a major base for the Imperial Japanese Navy until the end of World War II. The town and its military base were bombed repeatedly from the middle of July to middle of August 1945 during World War II. The base facilities were used by the United States Navy during the occupation of Japan, and (on a reduced scale) by the Japan Maritime Self Defence Force to date.

Ōminato merged with the adjacent town of Tanabe to form the city Ōminato-Tanabu (coupling of the names of two antecedent towns) on September 1, 1959; its name was changed to Mutsu in 1960.  At the time, it was the only city with a hiragana name (むつ), which was adopted to avoid confusion with the original kanji word Mutsu (陸奥) which indicates the old province that covered most of the modern Tōhoku region.

On March 14, 2005, the towns of Kawauchi and Ōhata, and the village of Wakinosawa (all from Shimokita District) were merged into Mutsu.

Government
Mutsu has a mayor-council form of government with a directly elected mayor and a unicameral city legislature of 26 members. Mutsu, together with Shimokita District, contributes three members to the Aomori Prefectural Assembly. In terms of national politics, the city is part of Aomori 1st district of the lower house of the Diet of Japan.

Economy
The economy of Mutsu is heavily dependent on agriculture, forestry and fishing, especially scallop aquaculture in Mutsu Bay. The city is also the location for various facilities of the Japan Atomic Energy Agency, and was the home port for the nuclear powered research vessel Mutsu, until its decommissioning in 1997.

Education
Mutsu has 12 public elementary schools and nine middle schools operated by the city government, and four public high schools operated by the Aomori Prefectural Board of Education. The Aomori Akenohoshi Junior College has a campus in Mutsu. The prefecture also operates two special education schools for the handicapped.

High schools
Tanabu High School
Ōminato High School
Mutsu Technical High School
Kawauchi Branch of Aomori Prefectural Ominato High School

Transportation

Railway
 East Japan Railway Company (JR East)  - Ōminato Line
  -  -  -  -

Highway
 Shimokita Expressway

Sister cities 
 Port Angeles, Washington, United States is a sister city of Mutsu. The two cities have an exchange student program set up.

Local attractions
 Mount Osore
 Lake Usori
 Yagen Valley
Kawauchi Dam, northernmost dam on Honshu

Noted people from Mutsu
Yuya Asahina, manga artist
Yuzo Kawashima, movie director
Ryu Fujisaki, manga artist
Fumie Hosokawa, actress and gravure model
Kenichi Matsuyama, actor

References

External links 

Official Website 

 
Cities in Aomori Prefecture
Port settlements in Japan
Populated coastal places in Japan